

Current listings

|}

Former listings

|}

Notes

References

Northeast Portland, Oregon
Northeast